Kravari (Macedonian Cyrillic: Кравари, 'cowherds') is a village  away from Bitola, which is the smallest village in North Macedonia.

Demographics
According to the 2002 census, the village had a total of 880 inhabitants. Ethnic groups in the village include:

Macedonians 871
Albanians 1
Turks 7
Serbs 1

Sports
Local football club FK Kravari plays in the Macedonian Third League (Southwest Division).

References

Villages in Bitola Municipality